John Andrew (1750–1799), MA was an English cleric, Archdeacon of Barnstaple from 1798 to 1799.

References

18th-century English Anglican priests
Archdeacons of Barnstaple
1750 births
1799 deaths
Alumni of Exeter College, Oxford